Valentina Corneli is an Italian politician and lawyer.

Career
Corneli was born on March 13, 1986, in Giulianova. She has a PhD in constitutional law.

She was elected to the Italian Parliament in the 2018 Italian general election.

References

Living people
Italian women lawyers
Five Star Movement politicians
1986 births
People from Giulianova
Deputies of Legislature XVIII of Italy
21st-century Italian women politicians
21st-century Italian lawyers
Women members of the Chamber of Deputies (Italy)